Ronny Graham (August 26, 1919 – July 4, 1999) was an American actor and theater director, composer, lyricist, and writer.

Life and career
Graham was born Ronald Montcrief Stringer in Philadelphia, Pennsylvania, the second of five children born to vaudeville performers Florence (née Sweeney) and Thomas Graham Stringer (a.k.a. Steve Graham). Graham, a self-taught jazz pianist, began his career as a nightclub comic with a specialty in wry character monologues for which he provided the musical accompaniment, à la Dwight Fiske. During World War II, Graham served in the Army, where he entertained GIs with a piano trio. He made his Broadway debut in the revue New Faces of 1952, to which he contributed sketches and lyrics and in which he performed. He won a Theatre World Award for his efforts. He later made similar contributions to New Faces of 1956 and New Faces of 1962. He wrote the lyrics for Bravo Giovanni, which garnered him a Tony Award nomination, and directed a string of unsuccessful plays, two of which closed on opening night, in the mid-1960s to early 1970s.

As a writer, Graham penned seven episodes of M*A*S*H (and guest starred as Sgt. Gribble in the episode "Your Hit Parade," for which he was program consultant) and nine episodes of The Brady Bunch Hour. He also co-wrote the screenplays for the Mel Brooks' films To Be or Not to Be (1983) and Spaceballs (1987), appearing onscreen as Sondheim in the former and the Minister in the latter. His other film credits included roles in Dirty Little Billy (1972), Won Ton Ton, the Dog Who Saved Hollywood (1976), The World's Greatest Lover (1977) and History of the World, Part I (1981). He had a recurring role on Chico and the Man and made guest appearances on Murder She Wrote, Picket Fences, and Chicago Hope. He was a frequent guest on The Tonight Show Starring Johnny Carson.  Graham played the character who dropped the clapperboard repeatedly in a famous, 1969 Alka Selzer "Spicy Meatball" advertisement and played the part of "Mr. Dirt" on a series of commercials for Mobil Oil in the 1970s. In 1975–76, Graham was featured in the recurring role of the Reverend Bemis during season 2 of the NBC sitcom Chico and the Man. In 1976 he co-wrote the Paul Lynde Halloween Special along with Bruce Vilanch. In 1996, he appeared as the character Louis Foukold in the screen adaptation of the Jon Robin Baitz play The Substance of Fire.

Graham was married four times, to Jean Spitzbarth (1947–1950), with whom he had one child; actress Ellen Hanley (1951–1963), with whom he had two children; Sigyn Lund (1965–1973), with whom he had two children; and Pamela Gill (1974–1999), to whom he was married when he died of liver disease in Los Angeles.

Filmography

New Faces of 1952 (1952) - Ronny
Dirty Little Billy (1972) - Charle Nile
Won Ton Ton, the Dog Who Saved Hollywood (1976) - Mark Bennett
The World's Greatest Lover (1977) - Director Dorsey
MASH, Season 6, Episode 19, Your Hit Parade (1978) - Sergeant Gribble
History of the World, Part I (1981) - Oedipus - The Roman Empire / Jew #2 - The Spanish Inquisition
To Be or Not to Be (1983) - Sondheim
Spaceballs (1987) - Minister
Life Stinks (1991) - Priest (voice)
Robin Hood: Men in Tights (1993) - Villager
The Substance of Fire (1996) - Louis Foukold

See also
Julius Monk

References

External links
 

1919 births
1999 deaths
American male film actors
American lyricists
American male screenwriters
American male stage actors
American male television actors
American theatre directors
Donaldson Award winners
Male actors from Philadelphia
20th-century American male actors
Songwriters from Pennsylvania
20th-century American male writers
Screenwriters from Pennsylvania
20th-century American screenwriters
United States Army personnel of World War II